The 2001 Melanesian Championships in Athletics took place in April, 2001. The event was held in Suva, Fiji, in conjunction with the Fiji national championships.

A total of 33 events were contested, 20 by men and 13 by women.

Medal summary
Medal winners and their results were published on the Athletics Weekly webpage.

Men

Women

Medal table (unofficial)

References

Melanesian Championships in Athletics
International athletics competitions hosted by Fiji
Melanesian Championships
2001 in Fijian sport
April 2001 sports events in Oceania